The National Security Advisor (NSA) is the senior official on the National Security Council of Pakistan, and the chief adviser to the Prime Minister of Pakistan on national security and international affairs. Moeed Yusuf served as the 9th NSA from May 17, 2021 to 3 April 2022, appointed by Prime Minister Imran Khan had the same rank as a Federal Cabinet Minister.

The National Security Adviser participates in National Security Council to brief the participants on issues involving the national security of the country and regularly advise the Prime Minister on all matters relating to internal and external threats to the country, and oversees strategic issues. In addition, the adviser frequently accompanies the Prime Minister on foreign trips.

The National Security Adviser is supported by the National Security Division (NSD) at the Prime Minister's Secretariat in Islamabad that produces research and briefings for the National Security Adviser to review and present, either to the National Security Council or directly to the Prime Minister. The post was created in 1969 by then-President Yahya Khan with Major-General Ghulam Omar being the first adviser.

List of National Security Advisers

See also
 National Security Council

References

External links
National Assembly Secretariat

Government of Pakistan
Cabinet of Pakistan